Classical is an album by the guitarist Wolf Hoffmann. It begins with a rendition from Georges Bizet's Carmen, Suite #1 playing the famous Fate Theme from Carmen's opera. Next is a version of Edvard Grieg's "In the Hall of the Mountain King." Track #4 is "Arabian Dance" by Peter I. Tchaikovsky. Ravel's "Bolero" becomes a bluesy piece. The CD's final track is a version of Edward Elgar's "Pomp & Circumstance".

Track listing
    Prelude		 – 1:25 	
 	 In the Hall of the Mountain King 	 	 – 3:14 	
 	 Habanera 	 	 – 5:14 		
 	 Arabian Dance  	 – 5:14 	
 	 The Moldau 	 	 – 4:54 	
 	 Bolero 	 	 – 8:17 	
 	 Blues for Elise 		 – 4:02 	
 	 Aragonaise 	 	 – 4:27 	
 	 Solveig's Song 	 	 – 3:45 	
 	 Western Sky 		 – 4:26 	
 	 Pomp & Circumstance 	 	 – 3:42

Band
 Wolf Hoffmann - guitars
 Peter Baltes - bass on #11
 Mike Brignardello - bass on #02, 03, 05, 07 & 09
 W. Anthony Joyner - bass on #10
 Michael Cartellone - drums & percussion
 Larry Hall - piano on #11
 Dr. Al Kooper - Hammond B3 organ on #07

External links
Classical at Amazon.com

1997 albums
Classical crossover albums